is a Japanese theatre and film character actor.

Biography
Furata has a broad range that goes from playing serious salary men, to bushi in period drama roles, and even women.

He works with the theatrical troupe called Otona Keikaku and often with the troupe Gekidan Shinkansen. Furuta also stars in the 2007 horror film Apartment 1303.

Personal life
He is married to the television talent Yayoi Nishihata.

Selected filmography

Film

Television dramas
Shinsengumi! (2004)
Tokyo Friends (2005)
Oh! My Girl!! (2008)
Amachan (2013), Taichi Aramaki
Doctor X (2014), Kiyoshiro Fujikawa (Episode 7 - 11)
Botchan (2016)
Daddy Sister (2016)
Shimokitazawa Die Hard (2017)
Fugitive Boys (2017)
Yell (2020), Homare Hatsukaichi
What Will You Do, Ieyasu? (2023), Ashikaga Yoshiaki

Television animation
PopoloCrois Monogatari (1998), Gamigami Devil
One Piece (2014), Byrnndi World (One Piece 3D2Y)
Shinya! Tensai Bakabon (2018), Bakabon's Papa

Video games 

 Ni no Kuni: Dominion of the Dark Djinn (2010), Drippy
 Recordings reused in Ni no Kuni: Wrath of the White Witch (2011)

Dubbing
Paddington (Henry Brown (Hugh Bonneville))
Paddington 2 (Henry Brown (Hugh Bonneville))
Power Rangers (Zordon (Bryan Cranston))

Awards

References

External links
 
 

1965 births
Living people
Japanese male actors
People from Kobe
Osaka University of Arts alumni